The ITF Women's Circuit – Baotou is a tennis tournament held on indoor clay courts at Baotou Olympic Park Tennis Center in Baotou, China. It has been held since 2018 and is part of the ITF Women's Circuit as a $60,000 event.

Past finals

Singles

Doubles

External links 
 ITF search 

ITF Women's World Tennis Tour
Clay court tennis tournaments
Tennis tournaments in China
Recurring sporting events established in 2018
2018 establishments in China